The Pickwick Papers is a 1952 British historical comedy drama film written and directed by Noel Langley and starring James Hayter, James Donald, Nigel Patrick and Joyce Grenfell. It is based on the Charles Dickens’s 1837 novel of the same name. It was made by Renown Pictures who had successfully released another Dickens adaptation Scrooge the previous year.

The film was made at the Nettlefold Studios in Walton-on-Thames. Shot in black-and-white, the film's sets were designed by the art director Frederick Pusey with costumes by Beatrice Dawson. It premiered at the Gaumont Cinema at Haymarket in London on 14 November 1952. In 1954, the Soviet Union paid £10,000 for the distribution rights, and it became the first British film to be shown in the Soviet Union after the Second World War, premiering on 29 July 1954 in a number of cities with a dubbed soundtrack. The film was followed a month later by a Russian reprint of Dickens' book, in 150,000 copies.

Cast

James Hayter as Samuel Pickwick 
James Donald as Nathaniel Winkle 
Nigel Patrick as Alfred Jingle
Joyce Grenfell as Mrs. Leo Hunter 
Hermione Gingold as Miss Tompkins 
Hermione Baddeley as Mrs. Bardell 
Donald Wolfit as Sergeant Buzfuz 
Harry Fowler as Sam Weller 
Kathleen Harrison as Rachel Wardle 
Alexander Gauge as Tracy Tupman 
Lionel Murton as Augustus Snodgrass 
Diane Hart as Emily Wardle 
Joan Heal as Isabella Wardle 
William Hartnell as Irate Cabman
Athene Seyler as Miss Witherfield
Walter Fitzgerald as Mr. Wardle
Mary Merrall as Grandma Wardle
Cecil Trouncer as Mr. Justice Stareleigh
Felix Felton as Dr. Slammer
Hattie Jacques as Mrs Nupkins
Sam Costa as Job Trotter
Noel Purcell as Roker
Raymond Lovell as Aide
George Robey as Tony Weller
Max Adrian as Aide
Alan Wheatley as Fogg
D. A. Clarke-Smith as Dodson
Jack MacNaughton as Mr. Nupkins
David Hannaford as Boy
Gerald Campion as Joe, the Fat Boy
June Thorburn as Arabella Allen
Barry MacKay as Mr. Snubbins
 Joan Benham as Miss Tompkins' Companion 
 Graeme Harper as 	Master Bardell 
 Arthur Mullard as Onlooker
 Cyril Smith as Ostler

Awards and nominations
James Hayter was nominated for the BAFTA Best British Actor award in 1953 for his portrayal of Samuel Pickwick.
The Pickwick Papers was awarded a Golden Bear in Berlin in 1954
In 1956, Beatrice Dawson was nominated for an Oscar for Best Costume Design, Black-and-White for the film's costumes.

Critical reception
Leonard Maltin gave the film three out of four stars, calling it a "Flavorful adaptation of Dickens' classic"; and TV Guide rated it three out of five stars, writing, "If ever a Dickens novel shouted to be filmed, it was The Pickwick Papers, and a jolly good job was done with this version...It's a very funny film with some of England's best light comedians and comediennes."

Colourised version
In 2012, a digitally restored and colourised version of the film was released on DVD, causing a renewed debate in the UK about colourisation of old black-and-white classics.

References

Bibliography
 Harper, Sue & Porter, Vincent. British Cinema of the 1950s: The Decline of Deference. Oxford University Press, 2007.

External links
 
 
 

1952 films
Films based on The Pickwick Papers
Films set in England
Films set in London
Films set in the 19th century
British historical comedy films
1950s historical comedy films
Films with screenplays by Noel Langley
Films scored by Antony Hopkins
Films shot at Nettlefold Studios
Films directed by Noel Langley
Films produced by Noel Langley
British black-and-white films
1950s English-language films
1950s British films